Dendropsophus norandinus, the North Andean tree frog, is a frog endemic to Colombia.  Scientists have seen it in exactly three type localities, all between 1420 and 1950 meters above sea level.

References

Frogs of South America
norandinus